Agelasta yonaguni is a species of beetle in the family Cerambycidae. It was described by Masao Hayashi in 1962. It is known from Japan.

Subspecies
 Agelasta yonaguni kashiwaii (Kusama & Takakuwa, 1984)
 Agelasta yonaguni similaris (Kusama & Takakuwa, 1984)
 Agelasta yonaguni subkonoi (Breuning, 1964)
 Agelasta yonaguni yonaguni (Hayashi, 1962)

References

yonaguni
Beetles described in 1962